Porky's II: The Next Day is a 1983 sex comedy film and the sequel to the 1981 film Porky's. The film is directed and co-written by Bob Clark. Unlike the previous film, Porky himself does not appear. A sequel, Porky's Revenge!, was released in 1985.

Plot
The Angel Beach High School Drama Club is producing a Shakespeare Festival in which the group from the first film is participating. A religious leader named Bubba Flavel wants to halt the production because his group, "The Righteous Flock," believe Shakespeare is indecent and profane. Flavel recruits the support of the local Ku Klux Klan chapter by informing them that the Festival will feature an interracial kiss between John Henry, a Seminole student playing Romeo, and a white Juliet played by Wendy. The students seek the help of County Commissioner Gebhardt, who promises to pull some strings to keep the Festival running. Gebhardt reneges on his promise after his aide delivers a stack of 5,000 petitions from voters that Flavel gathered. Meanwhile, the Klan attacks and beats John Henry. Though the Angel Beach principal, Mr. Carter, enthusiastically supports his students, he is forced to cancel the Festival after the county commissioners voted against it. The Angel Beach students plot revenge against Flavel, Commissioner Gebhardt, the rest of the county commissioners, and the Klan.

The teens discover that the county commissioners, while publicly espousing decency and morality, secretly gather to watch stag films in the courthouse basement. The students takes a tape recorder to the courthouse and record the commissioners' crude commentary on the films, which include remarks that Flavel provided the pornography.

After the Festival is cancelled, Wendy agrees to a date with Gebhardt at a classy restaurant. Wendy arrives in a deliberately showy, vulgar dress with her breasts artificially inflated by a secret container of fake vomit. Throughout dinner, she constantly shouts out Commissioner Gebhardt's name, his upcoming re-election, and her own age, alerting the other patrons to the situation. Once she has the attention of the entire restaurant, she announces that Gebhardt took her virginity and that she is now carrying his child. Finally, to complete Gebhardt's humiliation, she uses the fake vomit to pretend to throw up in a fountain. When Gebhardt tries to sneak away, Peewee jumps out with a camera, promising to send the photos to the local newspapers.

The students lure the Klansmen (who are on their way to Flavel's celebratory revival meeting) into the school gym, whose bleachers are filled to capacity with Seminoles. The students hold down the Klansmen while their Jewish friend, Brian, shaves their heads with an izmel. The Angel Beach students and the Seminoles then strip the Klansmen naked and force them to run across the stage of Flavel's revival. In the confusion, the students commandeer the public address system and play the recording from the courthouse basement. The outraged crowd turns on Flavel, the county commissioners, and the Klan. A closing montage of newspapers report Gebhardt resigns, Flavel is ousted from his position, the county commissioners face obscenity charges, and the Festival resumes.

Cast

Production
Greynolds Park in North Miami Beach, Florida stood in for the Everglades and a plant nursery on Old Cutler Road was turned into a cemetery for the graveyard scenes.

Cowriter Swaybill later said "It took us about six weeks to write the sequel. And it was before the cameras by June. The result was far less spontaneous. The kids just wanted us to be down and dirty."

Home Media
Porky's II: The Next Day was released on DVD on May 22, 2007, alongside Porky's and Porky's Revenge, in a DVD box set called The Porky's Ultimate Collection.

Kino Lorber released Porky's II: The Next Day, along with Porky's Revenge, as a double feature Blu-Ray on December 13, 2016. The theatrical trailer for the film is the only bonus material on the disc.

Reception

Box office
The film's gross receipts were considerably lower than the first Porky's film. While Porky's grossed $105 million in the North American market, Porky's II: The Next Day took in $33,759,266.

Critical response
 
Review aggregator Rotten Tomatoes gives the film a score of 11% based on the reviews of 9 critics. The film was nominated for a Stinkers Bad Movie Awards for Worst Picture, but lost to Krull.

References

External links

 
 

1983 films
1980s teen comedy films
1980s sex comedy films
20th Century Fox films
American sex comedy films
American sequel films
1980s English-language films
Films directed by Bob Clark
Films set in Florida
Films set in 1954
Films shot in Florida
Films about the Ku Klux Klan
Canadian sex comedy films
Teen sex comedy films
1983 comedy films
1980s American films
1980s Canadian films